Air Wick is an American brand of air freshener owned by the British multinational company Reckitt. It was first launched by creator Guy Paschal in 1943 in the United States, and is now sold worldwide.

History
Air Wick was first introduced in 1943 in the United States. In 1973, Air Wick had sales of $33.5 million, and earnings of $2.7 million, prompting the Swiss pharmaceutical company Ciba-Geigy (now Novartis) to investigate purchasing them. Ciba-Geigy took brief control of the company in 1974, before selling it to the British household products company Reckitt & Colman (now Reckitt Benckiser) in December 1984.

The sale was partly motivated by what Ciba-Geigy's top management saw as a product that was at odds with their corporate culture; their rationale was that as a chemical business, they should not be involved with consumer products. In October 2007, Reckitt Benckiser won a High Court ruling in a lawsuit with Procter & Gamble, over claims that the design of Air Wick Odour Stop was an exact copy of P&G's Febreze air spray.

In March 2012, Air Wick announced its partnership with the official charity of the United States' National Park Service, the National Park Foundation. The company launched four new scents inspired by Kaloko-Honokōhau National Historical Park, Virgin Islands National Park, Yellowstone National Park, and Glacier Bay National Park. Portions of the sales went to the National Park Foundation, to aid National Parks.

Products
The current Air Wick range includes the following products:
 Scented Oils
 Essential Mist Diffuser
 Automatic Sprays (Timed Air Freshener)
 Aerosol Spray
 V.I.P. Pre-Poop Toilet Spray

References

External links
 Official website

Cleaning product brands
Cleaning products
Products introduced in 1943
Reckitt brands